The Fifth Cabinet of Lee Hsien Loong of the Government of Singapore was announced on 25 July 2020 following the 2020 general election on 10 July, and came into effect on 27 July 2020.

Changes
There are seven new political office holders, six of whom are newly elected MPs:

In addition, there are six outgoing political office holders:

Composition

Cabinet 
The list of Cabinet ministers and other office holders was announced on 25 July 2020. In a press conference, Prime Minister Lee Hsien Loong said, "I'm rotating the ministers, especially the younger ones, to gain exposure and experience. We regularly do this during Cabinet shuffles, and the intent is to expose the office-holders to different portfolios to gain both breadth and depth to understand the intricacies of the issues, and to see things from different perspectives."

Senior Ministers of State

Ministers of State

Senior Parliamentary Secretaries

Reshuffles

27 July 2020–14 May 2021

15 May 2021–12 June 2022 
On 8 April 2021, Heng Swee Keat had announced that he was stepping aside as the 4G Leader citing "age" and "health" concerns. He also stated that he would relinquish his finance portfolio in the upcoming Cabinet reshuffle. As such, a Cabinet reshuffle occurred on 23 April 2021 where Lawrence Wong was announced to take over Heng Swee Keat as Finance Minister. 6 other Ministers were also rotated. Heng however continued to stay on as Deputy Prime Minister as well as Coordinating Minister.

As of 13 June 2022 
On 14 April 2022, Lawrence Wong was selected as the next 4G Leader, succeeding Heng Swee Keat. Thus a Cabinet reshuffle was announced on 6 June 2022 and carried out exactly a week later on 13 June 2022 where Lawrence Wong was promoted to Deputy Prime Minister and Acting Prime Minister in the Prime Minister's Absence. Lawrence also assumed responsibility of the Strategy Group in the PMO from Heng Swee Keat.

Summary

References

 

Cabinets established in 2020
Executive branch of the government of Singapore
Lists of political office-holders in Singapore
Current governments